The 2nd Composite Mounted Brigade was a formation of the British Army in World War I. It was formed by the 2nd Mounted Division during the Gallipoli Campaign on 4 September 1915 by absorbing the Nottinghamshire and Derbyshire and London Mounted Brigades. The brigade was dissolved on return to Egypt in December 1915.

Formation
Due to losses during the Battle of Scimitar Hill and wastage during August 1915, the 2nd Mounted Division had to be reorganised. On 4 September 1915, the 2nd Composite Mounted Brigade was formed from the 3rd (Notts and Derby) and 4th (London) Mounted Brigades.  Each dismounted brigade formed a battalion sized unit:
3rd Nottinghamshire and Derbyshire Regiment (Sherwood Rangers, South Notts Hussars and Derbyshire Yeomanry)
4th London Regiment (1st County of London, City of London and 3rd County of London Yeomanry)
The brigade was commanded by Br-Gen A.H.M. Taylor, former commander of the London Mounted Brigade.  The 1st Composite Mounted Brigade was formed at the same time with the 1st, 2nd and 5th Regiments.

Dissolved
The brigade left Suvla on 2 November 1915 for Mudros. It left Mudros on 24 November, arrived Alexandria on 28 November and went to Mena Camp, Cairo.  Each regiment had left a squadron headquarters and two troops (about 100 officers and men) in Egypt to look after the horses. The Nottinghamshire and Derbyshire and the London Mounted Brigades were reformed on 1 December and the 2nd Composite Mounted Brigade passed out of existence.

See also

 Nottinghamshire and Derbyshire Mounted Brigade
 London Mounted Brigade
 British yeomanry during the First World War

References

Bibliography
 
 

C2
Military units and formations established in 1915
Military units and formations disestablished in 1915